USS Connecticut (SSN-22) is a  nuclear powered fast attack submarine operated by the United States Navy.  Connecticut is the fifth active United States Ship to be named for the U.S. state of Connecticut, going back to 1776. The contract to build her was awarded to the Electric Boat Division of General Dynamics Corporation in Groton, Connecticut, on 3 May 1991 and her keel was laid down on 14 September 1992.  She was launched on 1 September 1997, sponsored by Patricia L. Rowland, wife of the Governor of Connecticut, John G. Rowland, and commissioned on 11 December 1998.

History
1999 was spent conducting shakedown operations that evaluated Connecticut weapons systems, sensors, stealth and engineering proficiency. She participated in Joint Task Force Exercise 2-99 as an opposing force asset, and completed acoustic trials, a shallow water exercise, and an anti-submarine warfare exercise.

In September 1999 Connecticut began a Post-Shakedown Availability (PSA) at the Electric Boat shipyard. Despite a 100% growth in the amount of PSA work, making this the submarine force's most demanding PSA, Connecticut completed all work ahead of schedule. This PSA concluded as the safest in the 100-year history of Electric Boat.

In April 2003, Connecticut surfaced through the Arctic ice at the University of Washington's Applied Physics Laboratory Ice Station (APLIS).  While there, she encountered a polar bear, which gnawed on her rudder for a while before disengaging.

On 31 March 2004 Connecticut put to sea in support of the War on Terrorism as part of the  Expeditionary Strike Group (ESG), returning to NSB New London on 2 September with a pierside band blasting Thin Lizzy's "The Boys Are Back in Town". For the next three years, Connecticut was largely confined to port as she underwent a prolonged maintenance cycle.

In early 2007, it was announced that Connecticut would be transferred to Naval Base Kitsap-Bremerton, in Washington's Puget Sound, following a six-month deployment commencing on 25 July 2007. She would be the last of the Navy's three Seawolf-class submarines to be transferred from New London to Kitsap as part of a larger U.S. Navy realignment shifting 60% of the fleet's submarines to the Pacific. Upon arrival at Kitsap on 30 January 2008, Connecticut joined her Seawolf sisters in Submarine Development Squadron Five.

In early 2011, Connecticut participated in ICEX 2011 to "train today’s submarines in the challenging Arctic environment", as well as "refine and validate procedures and required equipment."

Connecticut received extensive overhauls from 2012 to 2017. She returned to operation in early 2018 and participated in the Arctic ICEX 2018 operational readiness exercise. She later that year deployed to the western Pacific before returning on 30 January 2019.

From 26 March through 19 August 2019, Connecticut underwent maintenance and modernizing in a drydock at Puget Sound Naval Shipyard. The US$17 million project involved 30,000 worker days, and used a hull-climbing robot to inspect the ship's hull.

2021 seamount collision 
On 2 October 2021, Connecticut was damaged after she collided with a seamount while maneuvering in the South China Sea. About eleven sailors sustained injuries, though none were reported to be life threatening. The submarine's propulsion system were said to be operating normally. After an investigation, the commanding officer, his executive officer, and the chief of the boat were all relieved of duty.

The US Navy intends to repair the submarine, with work to begin in 2023.

See also 
Major submarine incidents since 2000
2005 USS San Francisco (SSN-711) seamount collision
2008 HMS Superb (S109) underwater pinnacle collision

References 

Based on the Naval Vessel Register, various press releases and former shipmates.

External links 

 
 

 

Ships built in Groton, Connecticut
Seawolf-class submarines
Nuclear submarines of the United States Navy
1997 ships
Submarines of the United States
Military in Connecticut
United States submarine accidents